Leonard Conley (born October 16, 1968) is a former American football wide receiver and linebacker in the Arena Football League. He played college football at Miami.

Conley was a member of the 1987 and 1989 Miami Hurricanes National Championship team.

References

External links
 Leonard Conley at The Football Database

1968 births
Living people
People from Tarpon Springs, Florida
Sportspeople from Pinellas County, Florida
American football running backs
American football wide receivers
American football linebackers
Miami Hurricanes football players
London Monarchs players
Miami Hooters players
Iowa Barnstormers players
New York Dragons players